A crude Buddhist medallion and a copper statue of a Hindu Deity, Ganesha, was found by American anthropologist Henry Otley Beyer in 1921 in an ancient site in Puerto Princesa, Palawan and in Mactan, Cebu. The crudeness of the artifacts indicates they are of local reproduction. Unfortunately, these icons were destroyed during World War II. However, black and white photographs of these icons still survive.

References

Ganesha
Bodhisattvas